The siege of Dyrrhachium took place from November 1107 until September 1108, as the Italo-Normans under Bohemond I of Antioch besieged the Adriatic port city of Dyrrhachium. Dyrrhachium was held for the Byzantine Empire by its doux Alexios Komnenos, a nephew of the reigning Byzantine emperor, Alexios I Komnenos. 

The siege is described at length in the Alexiad of Anna Komnene, daughter of Emperor Alexios. Previously, Emperor Alexios had been heavily defeated while trying to relieve a previous Norman siege of the same city in 1081. In this siege, Alexios chose not attempt to end the siege by means of a pitched battle but attempted to weaken the Normans by dispatching sorties to occupy the passes in the Normans' rear and prevent them from foraging. 

As the siege continued, Alexios attempted to spread disease in the Norman camp and used Greek fire to burn down their siege engines. Finally, Bohemond sought terms which led to the Treaty of Devol, whereby Bohemond and the Principality of Antioch became Byzantine vassals.

References

 
 
 

1107 in Europe
1108 in Europe
1100s in the Byzantine Empire
Albania under the Byzantine Empire
Dyrrhachium
Dyrrhachium
Dyrrhachium 1107
Dyrrhachium 1107
Alexios I Komnenos
History of Durrës
Dyrrhachium 1107